The Lakeland Conference is an athletic conference for high schools in southwest Michigan in the United States. Founded in 2022 with the inaugural season of play in 2022-2023, the conference is a reboot of the old Lakeland Athletic Conference to which it shares a similar geographic footprint, school membership and historic rivalries.

Sponsored sports
The league offers competition in nine boys' and eight girls' sports.

Boys
Baseball, Basketball, Cross Country, Football, Golf, Soccer, Tennis, Track and Field, Wrestling

Sports by school

Girls
Basketball, Competitive Cheerleading, Cross Country, Soccer, Softball, Tennis, Track & Field, Volleyball

Sports by school

Member schools
There are currently five member schools.  The geographic footprint of the league includes Berrien and Cass counties in Michigan.

Current members
School data in the table below is current for the 2022-23 season according to the MHSAA website.

Former members

Membership Timeline

Conference championships

Baseball

Boys Basketball

Girls Basketball

Boys Cross Country

Girls Cross Country

Football

Boys Soccer

Girls Soccer

Softball

Volleyball

Wrestling

State championships
Schools that have participated in MHSAA state championship finals while being members of the Lakeland Conference.

References

Michigan high school sports conferences
2022 establishments in Michigan